This is a list of radio stations in the Auckland Region of New Zealand.

FM stations 

There are 28 FM radio broadcast stations in Auckland, broadcasting on 38 frequencies. MediaWorks Radio and NZME Radio are the largest FM broadcasting networks, with 9 stations on 13 frequencies and 7 stations respectively. Radio New Zealand and Chinese Voice each broadcast two FM stations, and a number of other organisations broadcast FM stations.

Most FM radio broadcast stations in Auckland are transmitted from the Sky Tower. In addition, MediaWorks Radio broadcast two stations from the Lochamber transmitter (located between Hatfields Beach and Waiwera), and four stations from the Moirs Hill transmitter (located between Puhoi and Warkworth). Two Chinese language stations are broadcast from Waiheke Island, with another broadcasting from Pukekohe. A solar powered community radio station exists on Great Barrier Island, broadcasting from two locations (Port Fitzroy and Station Rock).

AM stations 

There are 16 AM radio broadcast stations in Auckland, broadcasting on 15 frequencies. NZME Radio, Radio New Zealand, and Rhema Media each operate two stations (the latter two operators sharing a frequency for one of their stations). A number of community and private organisations operate AM radio stations.

AM radio broadcast stations in Auckland are transmitted from Henderson, New Zealand, where two masts are located to the north and south of the Lincoln Road interchange with the Northwestern Motorway.

Low Power FM stations
There are numerous LPFM radio stations in Auckland.

Internet stations
There are a number of internet radio stations which stream and broadcast globally from Auckland, New Zealand. Internet radio is proving to become more popular, as stations tend to feature less ads, while also being able to report live listener statistics for advertisers.

Digital Audio Broadcasting (DAB) trial in Auckland

Kordia operated a DAB test service between October 2006 and 30 June 2018 transmitting from various Auckland locations on various frequencies in Band III.  At the conclusion of the trial the transmissions were on 222.064 MHz from Waiatarua.  The multiplex delivered a mix of DAB and DAB+ programmes in Auckland and Wellington.

References

Auckland